Visnes may refer to:

Places
 Visnes, Møre og Romsdal, a village in the municipality of Hustadvika in Møre og Romsdal county, Norway
 Visnes, Rogaland, a village in the municipality of Karmøy in Rogaland county, Norway
 Visnes, Vestland, a village in the municipality of Stryn in Vestland county, Norway

People
 Tom Cato Visnes, a Norwegian bass guitarist also known under the name King ov Hell